Greg Hart (born 23 April 1971) is a New Zealand cricketer. He played in five first-class matches for Central Districts in 1994/95.

See also
 List of Central Districts representative cricketers

References

External links
 

1971 births
Living people
New Zealand cricketers
Central Districts cricketers
Cricketers from Christchurch